Enver Erdogan is an Australian politician and Victorian Government Minister. He has been a Labor Party member of the Victorian Legislative Council since August 2019, representing Southern Metropolitan Region from 2019 to November 2022, and Northern Metropolitan Region from November 2022. He currently serves as Minister for Corrections, Youth Justice and Victim Support.

Biography 
Erdogan was first elected in August 2019 when he was appointed to fill the vacancy caused by Philip Dalidakis's resignation. On 26 June 2020, he became Chair of the Legislative Council's Standing Committee on the Economy and Infrastructure. On 25 June 2022, Premier Daniel Andrews appointed Erdogan as Parliamentary Secretary to the Attorney General. On 5 December 2022, Erdogan was elevated to Cabinet and sworn in as Minister for Corrections, Youth Justice and Victim Support.

A Turkish speaker of Kurdish descent, Erdogan is the first MP of Kurdish descent in any Australian parliament.

Erdogan holds degrees in Economics and Law from La Trobe University and was an Associate at Maurice Blackburn prior to becoming a member of the Legislative Council.

References

Year of birth missing (living people)
Living people
Australian Labor Party members of the Parliament of Victoria
Labor Left politicians
Members of the Victorian Legislative Council
21st-century Australian politicians
Australian people of Kurdish descent